The discography of American record producer, Chopsquad DJ. It includes a list of songs produced, co-produced and remixed by year, artists, album and title.

2014

Young Chop – Still 

 01. "Still" (featuring Chief Keef) 
 02. "All I Got" (featuring Fat Trel) 
 03. "Valley" (featuring Chief Keef) 
 04. "Some of Mine" 
 06. "Tre 073" (featuring Lil Dave) 
 07. "Never Gonna Change" (featuring YB, J-Rock South, BMore and Johnny May Cash) 
 08. "Ain't Fuckin' With Her" (featuring Ty Dolla Sign and Cap-1)

Laudie – Girl Talk 

 12. "Tiffany" (featuring Tiffany Foxx)

Shy Glizzy – Law 3 

 03. "Anywhere" (featuring 30 Glizzy and 3 Glizzy)

Lucki – X 

 10. "Stevie Wonder" (featuring Chance the Rapper)

2015

Rae Sremmurd – SremmLife 
 04. "My X"

Lil Durk 

 00. "Decline" (featuring Chief Keef)

Chief Keef 

 00. "Free Throw What?"

Chief Keef – Sorry 4 the Weight 
 04. "Get Money"
 06. "F'em"
 09. "That's What"
 14. "Send It Up"
 15. "Hiding"
 20. "Win"

Benji Glo – No Sight No Fear 

 04. "Type of Nigga" (featuring Chief Keef)

Johnny May Cash – My Last Days 

 01. "My Last Days"
 04. "I'll Solve It" 
 05. "Tacos" (featuring Cash Out) 
 06. "Where I'm From" (featuring SD)

Lil Bibby 

 00. "F.I.L.W.T.P"

Chief Keef - The Leek, Vol. 2 

 09. "Doctor"

Chief Keef 
 00. "Choppers On You"
 00. "Don't Think I Got One"
 00. "iCarly"

Capo 

 00. "Back In the Day"

Capo – G.L.O.N.L. 3 

 07. "Let Me Get My Money" (featuring Mass Money Boyz)

ManeMane4CGG 

 00. "Posted On The Block" (featuring King James and Capo)

Johnny May Cash - I'm My Favorite Rapper 

 01. "Do This Every Time" 
 02. "The Lick" (featuring Lil Dave)
 05. "Steal or Rob" (featuring Rampage)
 06. "Finesser" (featuring King 100 James)
 07. "Chasin' These Commas"
 08. "Pour Up"
 11. "Must Be My Enemy (featuring J Rock)
 14. "Steets Love Me" (featuring YB)
 15. "Pull Up, Hop Out" (featuring J Rock and YB)

Chief Keef – Bang 3 
 01. "Laurel Canyon"
 03. "Unstoppable"
 09. "I Just Wanna" (featuring Mac Miller) 
 10. "Yes"

SD – Just the Beginning 

 01. "Just the Beginning"

Chief Keef – Bang 3, Pt. 2 
 02. "Wit It"

King B – Write My Wrongs 

 06. "Move" (featuring Rich The Kid)

Young Chop – Finally Rich Too 

 01. "Errrthang"
 05. "Hittin Foe" (featuring King 100 James)

Chopsquad DJ – Forever Chopsquad  
 02. "Doctor" (performed by Chief Keef)
 02. "Say So" (performed by Lil Durk)
 03. "It's on Me" (performed by Lil Durk featuring Skippa Da Flippa and G Herbo)
 04. "Mounted Up" (performed by Chief Keef and Lil Durk)
 05. "Tomorrow (Remix)" (performed by Chief Keef and Lil Durk)
 06. "Cool" (performed by Chief Keef)
 07. "1 Foot Forward" (performed by Gucci Mane)
 08. "Blue Hundreds" (performed by Lil Durk)
 09. "Turn Up" (performed by Lil Durk)
 10. "OKC" (performed by Skippa Da Flippa and Migos)
 11. "On It (Bonus)" (performed by Chief Keef)

Lil Durk – 300 Days, 300 Nights  

 14. "Nobody"
 17. "Drug Party"

2016

Meek Mill – 4/4 Part 2 
 02. "Ricky"

Chief Keef – The GloFiles, Pt. 2 

 11. "Face"

Trav – Push 3 

 05. "10 of Yours" (featuring Meek Mill)

Migo Domingo – War Ready 2 

 02. "With That Shit" (featuring Jose Guapo and Skippa Da Flippa)

DJ Bandz – ChiLanta 2 

 02. "Shoot Sum" (performed by Lil Durk)

Young Chop – King Chop 

 07. "Fool With It" (featuring Lud Foe)

Lil Durk – Lil Durk 2X 
 04. "She Just Wanna" (featuring Ty Dolla Sign)
 09. "Set It Off"
 14. "Good Good" (featuring Kid Ink and Dej Loaf)

Lil Durk – They Forgot 
 13. "Rich Forever" (featuring YFN Lucci)

Yo Gotti – White Friday (CM9) 
 06. "They Like"

King Louie – Tony 2 

 07. "No Money"

2017

Lil Lonnie – Vi$ions 

 05. "See You On"

Lil Durk – Love Songs 4 the Streets 
 01. "No Choice"

Ethika – RBG 
 02. In My (performed by Lil Durk)

Tay Capone – 6ixOfEm 

 08. "B Rolls"

Prince Dre – Only The O In My Eyes 

 01. "Only the O"

Young Nero – Molly 
 04. "We Been on It" (featuring Lil Bibby)

Tristan Price 

 00. "Hottest"

Trouble – 16 

 06. "Royalty"

Lil Durk & Lil Reese – Supa Vultures 
 01. "Distance"
 03. "Unstoppable"
 04. "Fuck Dat Shit"
 06. "Nobody Knows"

Lil Lonnie 

 00. "IDGAF"

Doe Boy – In Freebandz We Trust 2 
 16. "Against Me" (produced with OG Parker)

Lil Durk – Signed to the Streets 2.5 

 05. "Too Raw" (produced with DJ Bandz)

Q-Sko – We Been Eatin''' ===

 10. "Go Get It" (featuring YoungBoy Never Broke Again)

=== Lil Durk ===
 No Standards

=== Tee Grizzley and Lil Durk – Bloodas ===
 01. "Bloodas"
 03. "Category Hoes"
 04. "3rd Person"
 07. "Rappers"

== 2018 ==

=== Young Chop – King Chop 2  ===

 03. "Yea" (featuring Bump J)
 06. "Set It Off"
 07. "Slow Down"

=== Zach Smith – February ===

 01. "Fall Out"

=== Rae Sremmurd – SR3MM ===

 09. "T'd Up" 

=== Famous Dex ===

 00. "Slap a Nigga"

=== Ballout – Glo Glacier  ===

 05. "Different"

=== Swae Lee – Swaecation ===
 03. "Heat of the Moment"

=== Tee Grizzley – Activated ===
 06. "Don't Even Trip" (featuring Moneybagg Yo)
 09. "Bag"
 10. "Time" (featuring Jeezy)
 12. "Light" (featuring Lil Yachty)
 13. "Low"
 14. "Bloodas 2 Interlude" (featuring Lil Durk)
 17. "I Remember" (featuring YFN Lucci)
 18. "On My Own"

=== King Von ===

 00. "Beat Dat Body" (featuring THF Zoo)

=== Ballout ===

 00. "Bank" 

=== Yung Bans – Yung Bans, Vol. 5 ===

 01. "Heart So Cold"

=== Trippie Redd – TR666+!$ 1400/800 ===

 02. "BILAP" (featuring Chief Keef)

=== Arod Somebody – Fed Bound 80 Months ===

 02. "Trap For Real" (featuring Youngboy Never Broke Again)

=== G Herbo – Swervo ===
 01. "Some Nights" 

=== Only the Family – Only the Family Involved, Vol. 1 ===

 07. "Rockstar" (featuring Yung Tory)
 13. "Problems" (performed by King Von)

=== Tee Grizzley ===
 No Rap Cap (feat. PnB Rock)

=== Tracy T – Shit Done Changed ===

 03. "Navigation" 

=== Chief Keef – Back from the Dead 3 ===

 02. "Just What It Be Like"
 03. "Vietnam" 
 08. "Free Smoke"
 10. "Jones Indiana" 

=== Lil Durk – Signed to the Streets 3 ===
 02. "Don't Talk To Me" (featuring Gunna) 
 10. "India, Pt. II" 
 13. "Benihana" (featuring Kodak Black)
 14. "I Know"
 18. "Is What It Is" 
 21. "Don't Talk To Me Remix" (featuring Gunna and Juice Wrld) 

=== Trippie Redd – A Love Letter to You 3 ===
 01. "Topanga"

=== Yung Bans – Yung Bans (2018) ===
01. "Did That Did That"

=== Omelly – Had to Hustle ===

 07. "Different" (featuring Chief Keef, Ballout and Tadoe)

=== Only the Family – Only the Family Involved, Vol. 2 ===
 08. "Man Down" (featuring King Von and Lil Durk)

=== 24hrs – B4 XMAS ===

 05. "Huh" (featuring Chief Keef)

== 2019 ==

=== 24hrs – Valentino Twenty ===
 04. "Fuck Sum"
 06. "Carry On" 
 10. "Backwood"

=== Trippie Redd ===
 00. "Time To Die" (featuring FreeMoney800)

=== King Von ===
 00. "Cousins" (featuring JusBlow600)

=== Chopsquad DJ ===

 00. "I Wish You Would" (featuring Chief Keef)

=== Lil Lonnie – True Colors ===

 01. "Lord Save Me"
 03. "On Go"
 08. "Advantage"

=== Tee Grizzley – Scriptures ===
 04. "No Talkin" 
 11. "Overseas"
 13. "Preach"
 14. "Young Grizzley World" (featuring YNW Melly and A Boogie wit da Hoodie)

=== YFN Lucci – 650Luc: Gangsta Grillz ===
 11. Skrrt Skrrt

=== UnoTheActivist – Deadication ===

 11. "Deadication"

=== Smooky MarGielaa ===

 00. "Trendsetter"

=== Yung Bans – Misunderstood ===
 02. "SOS" 
 15. "Yeaaa!" (featuring Future) 

=== Booka600 – Word to LA ===

 08. "Hold You" 

=== Lil Durk – Love Songs 4 the Streets 2 ===
 01. "RN4L"
 02. "Like That" 
 04. "Die Slow" (featuring 21 Savage)
 10. "Bora Bora"
 16. "Love Songs 4 the Streets"

=== Trippie Redd – ! ===
 04. "I Try"
 05. "They Afraid of You" (featuring Playboi Carti) 

=== Swae Lee ===
 00. "Sextasy" 

=== King Von – Grandson, Vol. 1 ===
 01. "Went Silly"
 02. "Tuff"
 04. "Crazy Story, Pt. 3"
 07. "No Flaws"
 08. "What It's Like"
 09. "Hoes Ain't Shit"
 10. "War with Us"

=== Slim Santana – Dark Angel ===

 08. "Darkside"

=== Trippie Redd – A Love Letter to You 4 ===
 06. "This Ain't That" (featuring Lil Mosey)
 12. "Sickening" (featuring Tory Lanez) 

=== YNW Melly – Melly vs. Melvin ===
01. "Two Face" 

=== Fabolous – Summertime Shootout 3: Coldest Summer Ever ===
 04. "Cap" (featuring Lil Durk) 

=== Guap Tarantino – Off the Charge ===
 02. "Hot Box"
 06. "Go Off"

=== Only The Family and Lil Durk – Family over Everything ===
 01. "Gang Forever" (With Lil Durk, King Von and JusBlow600)
 10. "This A Story" (With King Von)

== 2020 ==

=== Sada Baby – Skuba Sada 2 ===
 09. "Say Whoop"

=== King Von – Levon James ===
 02. "Take Her to the O"
 03. "On Yo Ass" (with G Herbo)
 04. "2 A.M."
 05. "Down Me" (with Lil Durk) 
 07. "Same as Us"
 08. "Message" (featuring NLE Choppa)
 09. "Broke Opps"
 13. "Str8" (featuring Tee Grizzley)
 14. "3 A.M."

=== Asian Doll – Doll SZN Reloaded ===
 06. "Pull Up" 

=== Sterl Gotti – Jungle Baby Vol. 2 ===

 02. "Prayers" 

=== Juice Wrld – Legends Never Die ===
 14. "Wishing Well" 

=== B-Win – First Take ===

 12. "I Tried" (featuring J Rock and Darri)
 14. "Trap Me" (featuring Darri and Trenchrunner Poodie)

=== King Von – Welcome to O'Block ===
 01. "Armed & Dangerous"
 02. "GTA"
 03. "Demon"
 06. "Why He Told"
 08. "Gleesh Place" 
 09. "All These Niggas" (featuring Lil Durk)
 10. "Can't Relate"
 11. "Mad At You" (featuring Dreezy)
 12. "Ain't See It Coming" (featuring Moneybagg Yo)
 13. "I Am What I Am" (featuring Fivio Foreign)
 14. "Ride"
 15. "How It Go"
 16. "Wayne's Story"

=== Justin Rarri – Youngest In Kharge ===
 11. "Left Right" 

=== Boss Top – Boss Baby ===
 10. "How We Rock" (featuring JusBlow600)

=== T.I. – The L.I.B.R.A. ===
 03. "Ring" (featuring Young Thug) 

=== Trippie Redd – Pegasus ===
 14. "Good Morning"
 15. "No Honorable Mentions" (with Lil Mosey featuring Quavo) 
 22. "Kid That Didd" (featuring Future and Doe Boy) 
 23. "Don"

=== NLE Choppa – From Dark to Light ===
 07. "Body Catchers"

=== D. Savage – BPL ===

 15. "IDC" (featuring Trippie Redd)

=== Blac Youngsta – Fuck Everybody 3 ===
 05. "Trench Bitch" (featuring Lil Durk)

=== YNW BSlime ===
 00. "Nightmares" (featuring Trippie Redd)

=== Lil Durk – The Voice ===
 02. "Finesse Out the Gang Way" (featuring Lil Baby)
 20. "Free Jamell" (featuring YNW Melly)

== 2021 ==

=== Spence Lee ===

 00. "Young & Humble" 

=== Tee Grizzley ===
 00. "Gave That Back" (with Baby Grizzley)
 00. "Robbery Part Two"

=== Only the Family – Loyal Bros ===
 16. "Glaciers" (with Booka600 and Boss Top)

=== Tee Grizzley – Built For Whatever ===
 02. "Not Gone Play" (featuring King Von)
 07. "Mad at Us"
 08. "Life Insurance" (featuring Lil Tjay)
 11. "High Speed"
 12. "Never Bend Never Fold" (with G Herbo)
 17. "Change"
 18. "Late Night Calls"

=== Mozzy – Untreated Trauma ===
 07. "Slimey" 

=== YNW BSlime ===
 00. "Citi Trends" (featuring NLE Choppa)

=== Fetty Wap – The Butterfly Effect  ===
 02. "Out the Hood"
 10. "Got A Bag"

=== Polo G – Hall of Fame 2.0 ===
 13. "Piano G"

== 2022 ==

=== King Von – What It Means to Be King ===
 01. "Where I'm From"
 02. "War"
 05. "Straight To It"
 06. "Trust Nothing" (featuring Moneybagg Yo)
 10. "Mad"
 11. "My Fault" (with A Boogie wit da Hoodie)
 12. "Change My Life"
 14. "Get Back" (with Boss Top, DqFrmDaO)
 15. "Get It Done" (with OMB Peezy)
 18. "Grandson For President"

=== Lil Durk – 7220 ===
 09. What Happened To Virgil (featuring Gunna)

=== Tee Grizzley – Half Tee Half Beast ===
01. "Half Tee Half Beast" 

=== Lil Tjay ===
 00. "Goin Up"

=== Tee Grizzley – Chapters of the Trenches ===
 13. "Free Baby Grizz Part 3"

=== Blue Bucks Clan – Clan Way 3 ===

 02. "Can't Believe It" 
 03. "Let Me Know (featuring Jeremih) 
 04. "Add It Up" 
 13. "Party" 

=== Only the Family – Loyal Bros 2'' 

 03. "Hanging With Wolves" (performed by Lil Durk) 
 07. "Feed Em Addy's" (performed by Booka600 and Lil Durk)
 12. "Mad Cuz I'm Rich" (performed by THF Zoo and Big30)

References 



Production discographies